3d Littoral Logistics Battalion (3d LLB) is a logistics battalion in the United States Marine Corps. They are headquartered at Marine Corps Base Hawaii and fall under the command of 3rd Marine Littoral Regiment and the 3rd Marine Division (3d MarDiv).

Subordinate units
 Headquarters & Service Company (H&S Co.)
 Littoral Logistics Company A (CLC A)
 Littoral Logistics Company B (CLC B)
 General Support Company (GS Co)

Mission
Provide tactical logistics support to the 3d Marine Littoral Regiment beyond its organic capabilities in the areas of motor transport, intermediate level supply, field-level maintenance, limited general engineering, landing support, and explosive ordnance disposal (EOD). On order, provide combat service support to III Marine Expeditionary Force (III MEF) units in the Pacific Area of Operations.

History

Combat Logistics Battalion 3 (CLB-3) was activated on 27 June 2008 from the previous Combat Service Support Group 3 (CSSG-3) on Marine Corps Base Hawaii in Kaneohe, Hawaii.

On 1 November 2008, just 121 days old and the youngest battalion in the United States Marine Corps, CLB-3 was designated the Logistics Combat Element (LCE) of the Special Purpose Marine Air-Ground Task Force – Afghanistan and deployed to Camp Bastion, a military base run by the United Kingdom in Southern Afghanistan. From November 2008 to May 2009, the battalion conducted combat operations in Southern Afghanistan providing all six functions of logistics: transportation, engineering, maintenance, supply, health services, and services to all Marine and NATO forces in Southern Afghanistan.

See also

 List of United States Marine Corps battalions
 Organization of the United States Marine Corps

Notes

External links
 CLB-3's official website
 Combat Logistics Battalion 3 Gears Down for Redeployment in Southern Afghanistan
 Combat Logistics Battalion 3 Constructs Combat Vehicle Operators' Training Course in Afghanistan
 Combat Logistics Battalion-3 Brings Mobile Exchange, Post Office to Marines in Remote Southern Afghanistan
 Service Members Enjoy Simple Pleasures in Southern Afghanistan
 CMC Visits Marines, Sailors in Afghanistan
 Combat Logistics Battalion 3 Counters Insurgency During Patrol in Southern Afghanistan
 Combat Logistics Battalion 3 Career Planner Beats the Clock in Afghanistan
 They Came, They Built, They're Redeploying – Engineers Pack Up After Seven-month Afghanistan Deployment
 CLB-3 Sets Bar in Afghanistan
 Marines, Afghans Improve Security on Route in Southern Afghanistan 
 Fighting the Dangers of Route 515
 Combat Logistics Battalion 3 Supplies Success During Operation Gateway III
 Marine Logistics Patrol Pushes Through IEDs, Insurgent Attacks in Afghanistan
 Marines of 3/8 Clear Southern Afghanistan's Deadly Route 515

CLB3